G. proximus may refer to:
 Gelanor proximus, a spider species in the genus Gelanor
 Geophagus proximus, a fish species in the genus Geophagus

See also
 Proximus (disambiguation)